Alpena Community College (ACC) is a public community college in Alpena, Michigan. It was founded in 1952. The college has a  main campus in Alpena and another campus, Huron Shores, located in Wurtsmith Air Force Base in Oscoda, Michigan.

The college offers associate's degrees to students in the arts, general studies, science, and applied science; and one Bachelor of Science degree in Electrical Systems Technology. There are also certificate programs in twenty concentrations and cooperative programs with seven universities and three community colleges.

Description

Alpena Community College is run on a semester schedule. Students are offered classes on campus and a multitude of online classes. The fall semester generally starts in the middle of August and the spring semester starts at the beginning of January. Summer classes are only six weeks long and can be started in the middle of May or at the end of June. Alpena also offers a dual enrollment program for qualified high school students, who can attend classes on campus or online.

Alpena Community College is a small, quiet college that offers several transferable programs. Before attending Alpena Community College a student should speak with a counselor to figure out which college would accept the credits from ACC. ACC offers a 2+2 bachelor's degree program in Nursing. A student usually attends Alpena Community College for two years and then attends Ferris State University for the other two years.  The future student must obtain a 2.0 grade point average in order for any credits to transfer. However, there are several other colleges that offer transferable degrees. Just like any other college, Alpena Community College offers all the courses that prepare a student for the nursing program and helps accelerate the student for an internship.

Programs

Art directors program
ACC has a Fine Arts Program. Right now nearly 60 percent of people who are in the art field are self-employed. Art directors make up the largest category of all artists, coming up with new designs and ways to present these designs. Art directors work on websites, articles, newspapers, and digital media. They look over this material to develop a design for publications. Usually art directors are in charge of the visual. The art directors work a normal work week, usually in offices at a firm or company. Some art directors are self-employed, and therefore they make their own work schedule and deadlines.

Psychology (Associate in Science)

This degree is intended for students who want to work in the psychology field, are pursuing an Associate in Science (AS) degree, or want to transfer to obtain a bachelor's or advanced degree in psychology. It stresses mathematics and biological factors in psychological phenomena. It can provide a foundation for clinical psychology, cognitive psychology, experimental psychology, forensic psychology, health psychology, physiological psychology, and neuropsychology.  A minimum of 60 credits is needed for the Associate in Science degree.

Pre-Medicine (Associate in Science)

This degree is suitable for students going into pre-dental or pre-medical studies. This program can be altered depending on the need of any particular student, so a consultation with an academic advisor is required. A minimum of 60 credits is needed for the Associate in Science degree.

References

External links
 Alpena Community College
 World Center for Concrete Technology

Two-year colleges in the United States
Michigan Community College Athletic Association
Education in Alpena County, Michigan
Buildings and structures in Alpena County, Michigan
Community colleges in Michigan
Educational institutions established in 1952
NJCAA athletics
1952 establishments in Michigan